Charlotte Teske (née Bernhardt; born 23 November 1949 in Sachsenhausen, a neighborhood in Waldeck, Hesse) is a former female long-distance runner from Germany, who represented West Germany at the 1984 Summer Olympics. She won the 1982 edition of the Boston Marathon, and the 1986 edition of the Berlin Marathon.

Achievements

References
 

1949 births
Living people
People from Waldeck-Frankenberg
Sportspeople from Kassel (region)
German female long-distance runners
Athletes (track and field) at the 1984 Summer Olympics
Olympic athletes of West Germany
Boston Marathon female winners
Frankfurt Marathon female winners